Granoblastic is an adjective describing an anhedral phaneritic equi-granular metamorphic rock texture. Granoblastic texture is typical of quartzite, marble, charnockites and other non-foliated metamorphic rocks without porphyroblasts. Characteristics defining granoblastic texture include: grains visible to the unaided eye, sutured boundaries and approximately equidimensional grains. The grain boundaries intersect at 120° triple junctions under ideal conditions. Variation from the ideal results from stress produced foliation during crystallization resulting in schistose textures. 

A rock that has a granoblastic texture can be termed a granofels.

References
Dictionary of Mining, Mineral, and Related Terms
Metamorphic Microstructures

Metamorphic rocks